Podgrab is a village in the municipality of Pale, Bosnia and Herzegovina.

Podgrab was an industrial town before the World War II, with a steam-powered sawmill built by Giuseppe Feltrinelli & Co. The area was a place of numerous forest railway operations stretching out to the north and south of town. The privately owned and run forest railway network was connected to the state-operated Bosnian Eastern Railway line.

References

Populated places in Pale, Bosnia and Herzegovina